Hasan Mohamed Al-Samahiji (born 22 February 1991) is a Bahraini handball player for Al-Najma and the Bahraini national team.

He participated at the 2017 World Men's Handball Championship and at the delayed 2020 Summer Olympics.

References

External links
 
 

1991 births
Living people
Bahraini male handball players
Expatriate handball players
Asian Games medalists in handball
Asian Games silver medalists for Bahrain
Asian Games bronze medalists for Bahrain
Handball players at the 2014 Asian Games
Handball players at the 2018 Asian Games
Medalists at the 2014 Asian Games
Medalists at the 2018 Asian Games
Olympic handball players of Bahrain
Handball players at the 2020 Summer Olympics